Nebulosa ocellata is a moth of the family Notodontidae first described by James S. Miller in 2008. It is found in cloud forests along the eastern slope of the Andes from south-eastern Peru south to Espiritu Santo in central Bolivia.

The length of the forewings is 12.5–13 mm for males and 13-14.5 mm for females. The ground color of the forewings is charcoal gray to dark gray brown. The central area of the hindwings is immaculate white.

Etymology
The name ocellata is derived from the Latin word meaning (having small eyes) and refers to the small eyes of this species compared to the large, rounded eyes of its sister species, Nebulosa plataea.

References

Moths described in 2008
Notodontidae of South America